In game theory, an asymmetric game where players have private information is said to be strategy-proof or strategyproof (SP) if it is a weakly-dominant strategy for every player to reveal his/her private information, i.e. given no information about what the others do, you fare best or at least not worse by being truthful. 

SP is also called truthful or dominant-strategy-incentive-compatible (DSIC), to distinguish it from other kinds of incentive compatibility.

An SP game is not always immune to collusion, but its robust variants are; with group strategyproofness no group of people can collude to misreport their preferences in a way that makes every member better off, and with strong group strategyproofness no group of people can collude to misreport their preferences in a way that makes at least one member of the group better off without making any of the remaining members worse off.

Examples 
Typical examples of SP mechanisms are majority voting between two alternatives, second-price auction, and any VCG mechanism.

Typical examples of mechanisms that are not SP are plurality voting between three or more alternatives, and first-price auction.

SP is also applicable in network routing. Consider a network as a graph where each edge (i.e. link) has an associated cost of transmission, privately known to the owner of the link. The owner of a link wishes to be compensated for relaying messages. As the sender of a message on the network, one wants to find the least cost path. There are efficient methods for doing so, even in large networks. However, there is one problem: the costs for each link are unknown. A naive approach would be to ask the owner of each link the cost, use these declared costs to find the least cost path, and pay all links on the path their declared costs.  However, it can be shown that this payment scheme is not SP, that is, the owners of some links can benefit by lying about the cost. We may end up paying far more than the actual cost. It can be shown that given certain assumptions about the network and the players (owners of links), a variant of the VCG mechanism is SP.

Notation 
There is a set  of possible outcomes.

There are  agents which have different valuations for each outcome. The valuation of agent  is represented as a function:

 

which expresses the value it has for each alternative, in monetary terms.

 

So .

A mechanism is a pair of functions:
 An  function, that takes as input the value-vector  and returns an outcome  (it is also called a social choice function);
 A  function, that takes as input the value-vector   and returns a vector of payments, determining how much each player should receive (a negative payment means that the player should pay a positive amount).

A mechanism is called strategyproof if, for every player  and for every value-vector of the other players :

Characterization 
It is helpful to have simple conditions for checking whether a given mechanism is SP or not. This subsection shows two simple conditions that are both necessary and sufficient.

If a mechanism is SP, then it must satisfy the following two conditions, for every agent :

1. The payment to agent  is a function of the chosen outcome and of the valuations of the other agents  - but not a direct function of the agent's own valuation . Formally, there exists a price function , that takes as input an outcome  and a valuation vector for the other agents , and returns the payment for agent , such that for every , if:
 
then:
 
PROOF: If  then an agent with valuation  prefers to report , since it gives him the same outcome and a larger payment; similarly, if  then an agent with valuation  prefers to report .

As a corollary, there exists a "price-tag" function, that takes as input an outcome  and a valuation vector for the other agents , and returns the payment for agent  For every , if:
 
then:
 

2. The selected outcome is optimal for agent , given the other agents' valuations. Formally:
 

PROOF: If there is another outcome  such that , then an agent with valuation  prefers to report , since it gives him a larger total utility.

Conditions 1 and 2 are not only necessary but also sufficient: any mechanism that satisfies conditions 1 and 2 is SP.

PROOF: Fix an agent  and valuations . Denote:
  - the outcome when the agent acts truthfully.
  - the outcome when the agent acts untruthfully.
By property 1, the utility of the agent when playing truthfully is:
 
and the utility of the agent when playing untruthfully is:
 
By property 2:
 
so it is a dominant strategy for the agent to act truthfully.

Outcome-function characterization 
The actual goal of a mechanism is its  function; the payment function is just a tool to induce the players to be truthful. Hence, it is useful to know, given a certain outcome function, whether it can be implemented using a SP mechanism or not (this property is also called implementability). The Monotonicity (mechanism design) property is necessary, and often also sufficient.

Truthful mechanisms in single-parameter domains 
A single-parameter domain is a game in which each player  gets a certain positive value  for "winning" and a value 0 for "losing".

For this setting, it is easy to characterize truthful mechanisms. Begin with some definitions.

A mechanism is called normalized if every losing bid pays 0.

A mechanism is called monotone if, when a player raises his bid, his chances of winning (weakly) increase.

For a monotone mechanism, for every player i and every combination of bids of the other players, there is a critical value in which the player switches from losing to winning.

A normalized mechanism on a single-parameter domain is truthful iff the following two conditions hold:
 The assignment function is monotone in each of the bids, and:
 Every winning bid pays the critical value.

Truthfulness of randomized mechanisms 
There are various ways to extend the notion of truthfulness to randomized mechanisms. They are, from strongest to weakest:

 Universal truthfulness: for each randomization of the algorithm, the resulting mechanism is truthful. In other words: a universally-truthful mechanism is a randomization over deterministic truthful mechanisms, where the weights may be input-dependent.
 Strong stochastic-dominance truthfulness (strong-SD-truthfulness): The vector of probabilities that an agent receives by being truthful has first-order stochastic dominance over the vector of probabilities he gets by misreporting. That is: the probability of getting the top priority is at least as high AND the probability of getting one of the two top priorities is at least as high AND ... the probability of getting one of the m top priorities is at least as high.
 Lexicographic truthfulness (lex-truthfulness): The vector of probabilities that an agent receives by being truthful has lexicographic dominance over the vector of probabilities he gets by misreporting. That is: the probability of getting the top priority is higher OR (the probability of getting the top priority is equal and the probability of getting one of the two top priorities is higher) OR ... (the probability of getting the first m-1 priorities priority is equal and the probability of getting one of the m top priorities is higher) OR (all probabilities are equal).
 Weak stochastic-dominance truthfulness (weak-SD-truthfulness): The vector of probabilities that an agent receives by being truthful is not first-order-stochastically-dominated by the vector of probabilities he gets by misreporting. 

Universal implies strong-SD implies Lex implies weak-SD, and all implications are strict.

Truthfulness with high probability 
For every constant , a randomized mechanism is called truthful with probability  if for every agent and for every vector of bids, the probability that the agent benefits by bidding non-truthfully is at most , where the probability is taken over the randomness of the mechanism.

If the constant  goes to 0 when the number of bidders grows, then the mechanism is called truthful with high probability. This notion is weaker than full truthfulness, but it is still useful in some cases; see e.g. consensus estimate.

False-name-proofness 
A new type of fraud that has become common with the abundance of internet-based auctions is false-name bids – bids submitted by a single bidder using multiple identifiers such as multiple e-mail addresses.

False-name-proofness means that there is no incentive for any of the players to issue false-name-bids. This is a stronger notion than strategyproofness. In particular, the Vickrey–Clarke–Groves (VCG) auction is not false-name-proof.

False-name-proofness is importantly different from group strategyproofness because it assumes that an individual alone can simulate certain behaviours that would normally require the collusive coordination of multiple individuals.

See also 
 Incentive compatibility
 Individual rationality - means that a player cannot lose by playing the game (i.e. a player has no incentive to avoid playing the game).

Further reading 
 Parkes, David C. (2004), On Learnable Mechanism Design, in: Tumer, Kagan and David Wolpert (Eds.): Collectives and the Design of Complex Systems, New York u.a.O., pp. 107–133.
 On Asymptotic Strategy-Proofness of Classical Social Choice Rules An article by Arkadii Slinko about strategy-proofness in voting systems.

References 

Game theory
Mechanism design